The 2021 FIM Motocross World Championship was the 65th FIM Motocross World Championship season. 

In the MXGP class, Tim Gajser started the season as the reigning champion after picking up his fourth world title in 2020. In MX2, Tom Vialle was the defending champion as he picked up his maiden world title in the previous year. The 2021 season saw the debut of Beta as a manufacturer in the MXGP class.

Race calendar and results
The championship was contested over eighteen rounds.

Russian athletes competed as a neutral competitors using the designation MFR (Motorcycle Federation of Russia), as the Court of Arbitration for Sport upheld a ban on Russia competing at World Championships. The ban was implemented by the World Anti-Doping Agency in response to state-sponsored doping program of Russian athletes.

MXGP

MX2

MXGP

Entry list

Riders Championship

Manufacturers Championship

MX2

Entry list

Riders Championship

Manufacturers Championship

See also
 2021 FIM Women's Motocross World Championship
 2021 Motocross des Nations
 2021 European Motocross Championship

References

External links

Motocross World Championship seasons
Motocross
Sport in Afyonkarahisar